William Garway or Garraway (1617–1701), of Ford, Sussex was an English politician.

He was a Member (MP) of the Parliament of England for Chichester in 1661 and for Arundel in March 1679, October 1679, 1681, 1685 and 1689.

References

1617 births
1701 deaths
People from Arun District
English MPs 1661–1679
English MPs 1679
English MPs 1681
English MPs 1685–1687
English MPs 1689–1690